Global 2000 may refer to:

 Forbes Global 2000, an annual ranking of the top 2000 public companies in the world by Forbes magazine.
 The Global 2000 Report to the President, commissioned by President Jimmy Carter to make projections for the future based on trends for the upcoming decades.
 , affiliate of Friends of the Earth Europe